The 2011 Turkish Grand Prix, formally the 2011 Formula 1 DHL Turkish Grand Prix, was a Formula One motor race held on 8 May 2011 at Istanbul Park in Tuzla, near Istanbul, Turkey. It was the fourth round of the 2011 Formula One season. The 58-lap race was won by the championship leader, Red Bull Racing's Sebastian Vettel after starting from pole position. His teammate Mark Webber finished in second place, and Ferrari's Fernando Alonso completed the podium in third position.

As a consequence of the race, Vettel extended his lead in the World Drivers' Championship to 34 points over McLaren's Lewis Hamilton, who finished the race in fourth position. Webber's second-place finish moved him into third place in the championship, 4 points behind Hamilton in third, and nine ahead of Jenson Button, who was sixth in Turkey. In the World Constructors' Championship, Red Bull extended their championship advantage to 43 points over McLaren, with Ferrari a further 40 points behind in third position.

It was the last Turkish Grand Prix until , when the COVID-19 pandemic caused disruption to the schedule.

Report

Background
With Turkey being the first European race of the season, several teams introduced upgrades to their cars in order to aid with their respective performances on the grid. Williams introduced improvements to help with the handling of their car, having suffered a testing start to the season with no points at the first three races. Hispania Racing set their sights on trying to overhaul Virgin Racing, by introducing updates to their car for the second successive race. Other teams to introduce packages were McLaren, Renault, Ferrari and Mercedes as they all strived to move closer on overall pace to Red Bull Racing, who were confident that they had rectified the KERS problems that had hampered their performance over the first few races.

Several teams made driver changes for the first practice session. Nico Hülkenberg substituted for Adrian Sutil at Force India, while Daniel Ricciardo drove in the place of Jaime Alguersuari at Scuderia Toro Rosso. Karun Chandhok took part once again, replacing Heikki Kovalainen at Lotus.

Tyre supplier Pirelli brought its silver-banded hard compound tyre as the harder "prime" tyre and the yellow-banded soft compound as the softer "option" compound. This was the same tyre selection that Bridgestone had chosen to bring to the Turkish Grand Prix for the past two years.

Before the race, Sebastian Vettel led the World Drivers' Championship with 68 points, 21 ahead of his nearest rival at the time - Lewis Hamilton - who was on 47 points. Hamilton had cut Vettel's lead from 24 to 21 points after winning his first race of the year, and also the first Vettel did not win, in China. Jenson Button was third in the standings with 38 points, 1 ahead of Mark Webber who had scored his first podium of the year when he drove from 18th to 3rd in China, three weeks previously. Fernando Alonso's Ferrari was still relatively slow compared to what it would be later in the year - and Ferrari hadn't been on the podium yet - he was fifth in the standings with just 26 points, 2 ahead of teammate Massa.

Red Bull Racing were the only team over 100 points and therefore lead the Constructors' Championship on 105. McLaren were the only other team to have a podium at all three races and were in second place on 85 points. Ferrari had less than half of Red Bull on 50 points, but were still in third place. Renault and Mercedes GP were fourth and fifth with 32 and 16 points respectively.

Free practice

The opening session was run in wet conditions – the first competitive session in which Pirelli's wet weather tyres had been used in the season – where Ferrari's Fernando Alonso was quickest by 1.4 seconds ahead of the Mercedes cars of Nico Rosberg and Michael Schumacher in second and third places respectively, with the only other drivers within two seconds of Alonso being the Renaults of Nick Heidfeld and Vitaly Petrov, and Kamui Kobayashi's Sauber. However, due to the conditions, many teams opted for conservative running with McLaren running the fewest laps; their pairing of Jenson Button and Lewis Hamilton completing five laps between them. Championship leader Sebastian Vettel caused a red flag during the session after spinning into the barrier; he put his right-rear wheel over the kerb at the exit of Turn 8 and thus ended the session – as well as his day's running – in 17th place.

The second session was held in drying conditions, where Button was marginally quickest ahead of Rosberg, the only drivers to record a sub-1:27 lap time. After sitting out the first session save for an exploratory lap, Hamilton ran 31 laps in the second session and finished third ahead of Schumacher and Mark Webber, who ran mainly long-distance stints during the session. Morning pacesetter Alonso was eleventh after a hydraulic problem limited track running, while on track, he had a spin at Turn 6. Pastor Maldonado crashed his Williams into the barrier, having run wide on the exit of Turn 8, and spun out on a damp patch. Virgin Racing's Jérôme d'Ambrosio later received a five-place grid penalty for ignoring yellow flags in the area of Maldonado's accident.

The third session saw the top four places taken by the Red Bull and Mercedes cars; Vettel finishing as the fastest driver ahead of Schumacher by 0.001 seconds. Webber was almost four tenths adrift in third, just edging out Rosberg in fourth, after recovering from a high-speed spin at Turn 8 during the session, while McLaren wound up fifth and sixth with Button getting the better of Hamilton.

Qualifying

The first session started with Kamui Kobayashi having a mechanical fault on his first flying lap, meaning that he was unable to post a qualifying time, but the race stewards ultimately decided to allow him to take part in the race. By the end of the session, both Lotuses were eliminated, with Heikki Kovalainen ending the session half a second behind Rubens Barrichello's Williams, who had been 17th. D'Ambrosio outqualified his teammate Glock on-track but with his grid penalty, he would start the race from last place. Vitantonio Liuzzi also outqualified Glock, with Narain Karthikeyan recording the slowest time, 1.7 seconds within the 107% benchmark.

The second session saw Vettel return to the top of the timesheets, recording the first instance of a sub-1:26 lap time all weekend. Rosberg also broke into the 1:25s as he ended the second part in second place ahead of Hamilton and Webber. A late lap from Nick Heidfeld saw him qualify for the final session at the expense of Rubens Barrichello. Adrian Sutil outqualified his Force India teammate Paul di Resta as they ended the session in twelfth and thirteenth places, with di Resta escaping a penalty for missing the weighbridge. Maldonado and Sergio Pérez were next on the grid ahead of the Toro Rosso pair, with Sébastien Buemi getting the better of Jaime Alguersuari by three tenths.

Rosberg finished third, moving ahead of Lewis Hamilton on his final run, with Alonso in fifth having not improved on his first run time. Jenson Button qualified in sixth place for McLaren, followed by Vitaly Petrov in the Renault and Schumacher in the second Mercedes in eighth. Heidfeld and Felipe Massa completed the top ten, with Massa failing to record a time, abandoning his only run in Q3 due to a mistake and elected to save tyres for the race.

Race

All the drivers started except for Timo Glock, who lost fifth gear prior to the race. Sebastian Vettel led the race from the start, with a lead of 6 seconds by the time he took his first pitstop on lap 10. Behind him there were battles, with Fernando Alonso and Mark Webber fighting for second place in the closing laps, the victory falling to Webber giving Red Bull a one-two result. Behind Webber and Alonso, Hamilton and Button fought for fourth place, with Hamilton getting the upper hand, and Nico Rosberg later slipping in between the pair, taking fifth from Button when Button's tyres were degrading massively on the last stint. Paul di Resta made a bad pit exit with a loose wheel, and retired from the race.

The race, which had the most pitstops for a Grand Prix race ever (over 80) and the most overtaking moves since 1983, extended Sebastian Vettel's lead in the world championship standings to 93 points to second placed Hamilton's 59. In the constructors' standings, Red Bull increased their tally to 148 points to McLaren's 105, with Ferrari in third place with 65.

Classification

Qualifying

Notes:
 – Jérôme d'Ambrosio was given a five-place grid penalty, for ignoring yellow flags in the area of Pastor Maldonado's accident in the second free practice session.
 – Kamui Kobayashi failed to set a time in qualifying after experiencing problems with his fuel pump. However, he was permitted to take part in the race because he had consistently demonstrated lap times that were well within the 107% margin during free practice.

Race

Championship standings after the race 

Drivers' Championship standings

Constructors' Championship standings

 Note: Only the top five positions are included for both sets of standings.

See also 
 2011 Istanbul Park GP2 Series round
 2011 Istanbul Park GP3 Series round

References

External links

Turkish
Turkish Grand Prix
Turkish Grand Prix
May 2011 sports events in Turkey